Romania participated in the Eurovision Song Contest 2009 in Moscow, Russia. They selected their entry, "The Balkan Girls", by Romanian singer Elena through the national selection competition Selecția Națională 2009 organised by Romanian Television (TVR) in January 2009. Prior to the 2009 Eurovision Song Contest, Romania competed eleven times since its first entry in 1994. Its highest placing in the contest had been third place, which the nation achieved in 2005. In 2008, Romania finished in 20th place. "The Balkan Girls" attained local commercial success, topping the Romanian Top 100 in April.

The song was promoted by a music video and live performances in the Netherlands, Belgium, Germany and the United Kingdom. Romania qualified in ninth place from the contest's first semi-final on 12 May and ultimately reached 19th place in the Grand Final on 16 May, achieving 40 points. This remains one of the country's lowest Eurovision placements. Elena was accompanied by four female dancers and a background singer during her performance. Conceived as a reinterpretation of the Ieles in Romanian mythology, the show was aided by 3D computer graphics of a blooming forest.

Before Eurovision

Selecția Națională 2009

Competing entries
Romanian Television (TVR) organised Selecția Națională 2009, a competition to select their entrant for the Eurovision Song Contest 2009. In early January 2009, the broadcaster published a provisory list of 24 contestants. Out of 177 eligible tracks submitted to TVR from 15 November to 23 December, the entries were chosen on 8 January by an 11-member jury made up of music professionals and media personalities: Zoia Alecu, Sanda Cepraga, Cătălin Crișan, Adrian Despot, Viorel Găvrilă, Mihai Georgescu, Bogdan Miu, George Natsis, George Popa, Răzvan Popescu and Mihai Trăistariu. The submission deadline had been initially set to 15 December, with its extension to attract more entries promopting sources including Gardianul to incorrectly state that this was because only five songs had been submitted. For the first time, Selecția Națională was restricted solely to Romanian composers.

Shows
Selecția Națională 2009 was divided in two semi-finals on 27 and 29 January, and the final on 31 January. The results in each show of the competition—hosted by Radio 21 hosts Orlando, Escu and Popescu—were determined by a 50/50 combination of votes from a jury panel and a public televote. The six best-ranked entries from each semi-final advanced to the final round. On the latter occasion, Swedish trio Biondo was employed as the interval act. All participants had been promoted by music videos that were broadcast by TVR. The jury that analysed the songs in the final was composed of Dana Dorian, Liana Elekes, Cristian Faur, Andrei Kerestely, Ștefan Neaftanaila, Marcel Pavel, Aura Urziceanu, George Zafiu and Cristian Zgabercea.

{| class="wikitable sortable plainrowheaders" style="margin: 1em auto 1em auto; text-align:center"
|-
|+ Semi-final 2 – 29 January 
|-
! scope="col" | Draw
! scope="col" | Artist
! scope="col" | Song
! scope="col" | Result
|-
! scope="row" style="text-align:center; | 01
| style="text-align:left;" | Besa Kokëdhima
| style="text-align:left;" | "Nothing Gonna Change"
| Eliminated
|- style="font-weight:bold; background:navajowhite;"
! scope="row" style="text-align:center; font-weight:bold; background:navajowhite;" | 02
| style="text-align:left;" | Red Blonde
| style="text-align:left;" | "Nu am cu cine"
| Advanced
|-
! scope="row" style="text-align:center; | 03
| style="text-align:left;" | 
| style="text-align:left;" | "Go On"
| Eliminated
|- style="font-weight:bold; background:navajowhite;"
! scope="row" style="text-align:center; font-weight:bold; background:navajowhite;" | 04
| style="text-align:left;" | Cătălin
| style="text-align:left;" | "Stop"
| Advanced
|-
! scope="row" style="text-align:center; | 05
| style="text-align:left;" | SoundCheck
| style="text-align:left;" | "You Are My Love"
| Eliminated
|-
! scope="row" style="text-align:center; | 06
| style="text-align:left;" | Ethnic
| style="text-align:left;" | ""
| Eliminated
|-
! scope="row" style="text-align:center; | 07
| style="text-align:left;" | 
| style="text-align:left;" | "I Feel Your Presence"
| Eliminated
|-
! scope="row" style="text-align:center; | 08
| style="text-align:left;" | Alexa
| style="text-align:left;" | "One Last Night"
| Eliminated
|- style="font-weight:bold; background:navajowhite;"
! scope="row" style="text-align:center; font-weight:bold; background:navajowhite;" | 09
| style="text-align:left;" | 
| style="text-align:left;" | "Don't Leave"
| Advanced'|- style="font-weight:bold; background:navajowhite;"
! scope="row" style="text-align:center; font-weight:bold; background:navajowhite;" | 10
| style="text-align:left;" | Imba
| style="text-align:left;" | "Round & Round"
| Advanced
|- style="font-weight:bold; background:navajowhite;"
! scope="row" style="text-align:center; font-weight:bold; background:navajowhite;" | 11
| style="text-align:left;" | Costi Ioniță
| style="text-align:left;" | "Can You Forgive"
| Advanced
|- style="font-weight:bold; background:navajowhite;"
! scope="row" style="text-align:center; font-weight:bold; background:navajowhite;" | 12
| style="text-align:left;" | Elena
| style="text-align:left;" | ""
| Advanced
|}

Promotion
To promote "The Balkan Girls", an accompanying music video was directed by Dragoș Buliga close to disused railway bridges in Argeș County and at Bucharest's Silver Church Club. It was premiered on 15 March 2009 on TVR1's Danutz S. R. L.'', and was subsequently uploaded to YouTube the following day. In the same month, an alternative clip was shot for Radio 21's Women's Day campaign. Elena performed "The Balkan Girls" several times prior to Eurovision, including during events in the Netherlands and Belgium. She sang the song at the ITB Berlin in March; she was interviewed by the Berlin press and sent the track to local radio and television stations. Furthermore, the singer performed "The Balkan Girls" at the UK Eurovision Preview Party in London's Scala club, and her Eurovision participation was endorsed by an advertisement from Romanian football manager Gheorghe Hagi.

At Eurovision

The Eurovision Song Contest 2009, at the Olympic Indoor Arena in Moscow, consisted of two semi-finals on 12 and 14 May, respectively, and the final on 16 May. According to Eurovision rules, all participating countries except the host and the "Big Four" (France, Germany, Spain and the United Kingdom) were required to advance from a semi-final to compete in the final; the top ten countries from each semi-finals progressed to the final. In Romania, the show was broadcast on TVR, with Dan Manoliu as the country's head of delegation. Elena was scheduled for technical rehearsals on 4, 8 and 11 May. She performed 14th in the first semi-final, preceded by North Macedonia and followed by Finland, and sang 22nd in the Grand Final, preceded by Ukraine and followed by the United Kingdom.

The concept of Elena's show—directed by Bobo Bărbulescu—was a "modern reinterpretation" of the Ieles, feminine creatures in Romanian mythology. Thus, the four female dancers accompanying the singer onstage wore hair extensions and "shredded mermaid frocks"; Elena sported a flesh-colored dress and high heels. She was also aided by the background vocalist Lucia Dumitrescu. 3D computer graphics were used during the performance, seeing a "mysterious" forest bloom as a sunrise is depicted. The show further made use of a  fiberglass-and-polyurethane throne. Alongside Bărbulescu, Oana Draghici was hired as the art director, Ioana Macarie as the choreographer and Matei Ovejad as the special effects supervisor.

Voting
Below is a breakdown of points awarded to Romania in the contest's first semi-final and Grand Final, as well as by the country on both stages. In the semi-final, Romania finished in ninth position, being awarded a total of 67 points, including ten from Portugal and eight from Israel. In the Grand Final, the nation reached 19th place with 40 points, including 12 from Moldova and seven from Spain, one of Romania's lowest scores in the contest. Additionally, the European Broadcasting Union released the split final results, further revealing that Elena had placed 14th in the televote and 21st with the juries. Romania awarded its 12 points to Turkey in the semi-final and to Moldova in the final. For the announcement of the points, Romanian television presenter Alina Sorescu was the country's spokesperson announcing its voting results.

Points awarded to Romania

Points awarded by Romania

Detailed voting results

Notes

References

2009
Countries in the Eurovision Song Contest 2009
Eurovision